"Take It to the Streets" was the lead single released from Rampage's debut album, Scout's Honor… by Way of Blood. The song was produced by Rashad Smith and featured vocals from R&B singer Billy Lawrence. It used a sample of Unlimited Touch's 1981 single "I Hear Music in the Streets".

Released in the summer of 1997, "Take It to the Streets" became both Rampage and Billy Lawrence's biggest hit, reaching number 34 on the Billboard Hot 100 and number five on the Hot Rap Singles chart.

Single track listing

A-Side
"Take It to the Streets" (LP Version) – 3:38
"Take It to the Streets" (Instrumental) – 3:38

B-Side
"Wild for da Night" (LP Version) – 4:34
"Wild for da Night" (Instrumental) – 4:32

Chart history

Peak positions

Year-End charts

References

1997 singles
1997 songs
Songs written by Rashad Smith
Elektra Records singles